The 2019 National Premier Leagues Victoria was the sixth season of the National Premier Leagues Victoria, the top league in Victorian football. Heidelberg United were the defending champions, having won their first championship title the previous season.

Teams
Fourteen teams competed in the league – the top twelve teams from previous season and the two teams promoted from the NPL Victoria 2. The promoted teams were Dandenong City from the Eastern conference and Altona Magic from the Western conference. They replaced Northcote City and Bulleen Lions.

Stadiums and locations

Note: Table lists in alphabetical order.

League table

Results

Season statistics

Scoring

Top scorers

Discipline

Player 
 Most yellow cards: 10
  Matthew Reid (Avondale)

 Most red cards: 2
  James Kelly (Dandenong City)
  Jack Petrie (Heidelberg United)

References

External links
 Official website

2019 in Australian soccer